Allen Township, Pennsylvania may refer to:
 Allen Township, Northampton County, Pennsylvania
 East Allen Township, Northampton County, Pennsylvania
 Lower Allen Township, Cumberland County, Pennsylvania
 Upper Allen Township, Cumberland County, Pennsylvania

See also
 Allentown, Pennsylvania